Transportation Safety Board may refer to:

 Transportation Safety Board of Canada, a government agency of Canada
 Taiwan Transportation Safety Board, a government agency of Taiwan
 National Transportation Safety Board, a government agency of the United States